This is a list of articles about scholarly journals in ecological, resource and environmental economics.

A 
 Agricultural and Resource Economics Review
 American Journal of Agricultural Economics
 Annual Review of Resource Economics
 Australian Journal of Agricultural and Resource Economics

C
 Climate Change Economics
 Climate Policy

E 
 Ecological Economics
 Economic and Environmental Geology
 Economics of Disasters and Climate Change
 Energy Economics
 Energy Journal
 Energy Policy
 Environment and Development Economics
 Environmental and Resource Economics
 Environmental Economics
 Environmental Management
 Economics of Energy and Environmental Policy
 Environmental Science and Policy

G 
 Growth and Change

I 
 International Journal of Ecology & Development

J 
 Journal of Agricultural and Applied Economics
 Journal of Agricultural and Resource Economics
 Journal of Development Economics
 Journal of Environmental Economics and Management
 Journal of Environmental Economics and Policy Journal of Environmental Management Journal of Environmental Planning and Management Journal of the Association of Environmental and Resource Economics Journal of Transport Economics and Policy L 
 Land Economics M 
 Marine Resource Economics N 
 Natural Resources Journal Natural Resource Modeling R 
 Resource and Energy Economics Review of Environmental Economics and Policy W 
 Water Resources Research''

See also 
 List of economics journals
 List of environmental journals
 List of environmental social science journals

 Environmental
 
Environmental economics
Environmental economics journals